Ctenoglypta is a genus of small air-breathing land snails, terrestrial pulmonate gastropod mollusks in the family Euconulidae, the hive snails.

Species 
Species within the genus Ctenoglypta include:
 † Ctenoglypta newtoni

References

 
Euconulidae
Taxa named by César Marie Félix Ancey
Taxonomy articles created by Polbot